James Stephen may refer to:
James Stephen (architect) (1858–1938), American architect
James Stephen (British politician) (1758–1832), British abolitionist lawyer and Member of Parliament
Sir James Stephen (civil servant) (1789–1859), British under-secretary for the colonies, 1836–1847
Sir James Fitzjames Stephen (1829–1894), British judge and anti-libertarian writer
James Stephen (Australian politician) (1822–1881), member of the Victorian Legislative Assembly, Attorney-General of Victoria and Supreme Court judge
James Kenneth Stephen (1859–1892), English poet
Jimmy Stephen (1922–2012), footballer

See also 
James Stephens (disambiguation)